Robert Sesse was an Anglican priest in Ireland in the eighteenth century.

Sesse was born in Dublin and educated at Trinity College there. He was Dean of Cloyne in 1714.

Notes

Alumni of Trinity College Dublin
Deans of Cloyne
18th-century Irish Anglican priests
Christian clergy from Dublin (city)